Trymatococcus is a genus of trees in the family Moraceae, native to South America.

Taxonomy
The genus Trymatococcus contains the following species:
 Trymatococcus amazonicus Poepp. & Endl.
 Trymatococcus oligandrus (Benoist) Lanj.

References

Moraceae
Moraceae genera